Rhone Apparel (referred to simply as Rhone) is an American company producing and selling men's sportswear (activewear).

History 
Rhone was founded in 2014 in New Canaan, Connecticut by Carras Holmstead, Casey Edgar, Kyle McClure and brothers Nate and Ben Checketts. The company's name derives from the river and region in Europe of the same name, as the founders were inspired by the reputation of the Rhône as historically essential to surrounding civilizations as well as the river being aesthetically beautiful.

While the company originally launched as a web-only retailer, Rhone partnered with Bloomingdale's in November 2014 to sell at five locations. In 2015, the company was stocked in 127 locations total with retailers such as Nordstrom, Equinox, and CorePower Yoga. It earned 62% of its total 2014 annual revenue in November 2015.

In September 2015, the company announced the closing of a $5 million Series A financing. Investors included individuals from sports, media, and fashion circles. Since its launch, Rhone has raised a total of $6.2 million. In February 2016, Rhone purchased a building in Stamford to use as its new headquarters.

Profile and products 
Rhone is a clothing line for men aged between 25-50, who have an active lifestyle. It uses sustainable fabrics like organic cotton, recycled polyester, marino wool, and modal.

The company's product line aims to distinguish itself from brands like Lululemon, Nike, and Under Armour, by claiming that it uses superior materials in order to create clothes that last longer than the average product. 

Research on antimicrobial fabrics, the founders discovered that weaving silver into cloth created permanent antibacterial and anti-odorant protection. Silver thread is woven into many of the company's products.

Inspirational messages are sometimes stitched on, such as "Don't Die Without a Few Scars" or "What We Do in Life Echoes in Eternity." Flatlock stitching, where the seams lie flat with edges of fabric butting together rather than folding together, is used to avoid chafing. The Polartec Power Dry patented construction creates a fabric that is quick wicking to improve breathability and performance.

Style names come from masculine icons like Durden after "Fight Club" character Tyler Durden or Mako after the shark from The Old Man and the Sea.

References

External links 
 

American companies established in 2014
Sportswear brands
Companies based in Stamford, Connecticut
Sporting goods manufacturers of the United States